Sid Wallace (born 30 May 1957) was an English footballer who most famously played for Waterford United.

Wallace's first competitive match was a rugby league one, playing for Greenburg Street in the Wigan Amateur league, where he remained for four years before switching codes to the round ball. He signed for Everton Youths, where his teammates included Cliff Marshall, the Toffees' first ever black player, and Dave Jones (footballer born 1956). He also recalled Bob Latchford as the star at the club, an England international who was a prolific goalscorer. Syd was himself not shy in front of goal, but in season 1973/74, after making 22 appearances and scoring 21 times, he had the misfortune to break his leg against Blackpool.

Syd's bad luck was to work in Waterford's favour however, as he began his return from the injury. The Blues manager at the time, John McSeveney, happened to be a good friend of Everton manager Billy Bingham, and in fact was best man at his wedding, and he asked Bingham if he could help out by sending someone over who could get some goals. Syd decided to come to Waterford and see how it worked out, and what started out to be a twelve-month stint went on for five years.

He made his League of Ireland debut for the Blues against Bohemians on 9 November 1975 

The following week he netted his first goal against Shelbourne at Harold's Cross Stadium. In January 1976 he briefly played with Bobby Charlton who had signed a short-term contract at Waterford. He was the top scorer in the 1976-77 League of Ireland season  Wallace was Player of the Month in December 1977.

He scored the winning goal in the 1979 FAI Cup semi final against Shamrock Rovers at Dalymount Park. Despite losing the FAI Cup Final to Dundalk this guaranteed entry to the 1979–80 European Cup Winners' Cup as the Lilywhites had won the Double (association football). Unfortunately for Wallace he missed both ties against IFK Göteborg through injury.

In the summer of 1976, Wallace played for the Utah Golden Spikers of the American Soccer League. In the summer of 1977, he played in Canada in the National Soccer League with Windsor Stars. In his debut season with Windsor he recorded 25 goals in 24 matches. In the summer of 1978, he played for the Southern California Lazers. In the summer of 1979, he played for the Cleveland Cobras.

Honours 
FAI Cup: 
 Waterford United – 1980

References

English footballers
1957 births
American Soccer League (1933–1983) players
Utah Golden Spikers players
Southern California Lazers players
Cleveland Cobras players
Living people
Waterford F.C. players
League of Ireland players
Canadian National Soccer League players
Expatriate association footballers in the Republic of Ireland
English expatriate footballers
League of Ireland XI players
British expatriates in the United States
English expatriate sportspeople in the United States
Expatriate soccer players in the United States
Association football forwards